Mohammad Maqbool Hossain is a Bangladesh Nationalist Party politician and the former Member of Parliament of Rajshahi-6.

Career
Hossain was elected to parliament from Rajshahi-6 as a Bangladesh Nationalist Party candidate in 1979.

References

Bangladesh Nationalist Party politicians
Living people
2nd Jatiya Sangsad members
Year of birth missing (living people)